The Aflaj Irrigation Systems of Oman are ancient water channels from 500 AD located in the regions of Dakhiliyah, Sharqiyah and Batinah. However, they represent a type of irrigation system as old as 5000 years in the region named as Qanat or Kariz as originally named in Persia.

"Aflaj" is the plural of "Falaj", which means "split into parts" in classical Arabic. This irrigation system effectively divided the water among all the inhabitants; it flowed by gravity from their original sources to homes and cropland. The complex included watchtowers to protect it, but also mosques and other buildings.

In 2006, five Aflaj Irrigation Systems of Oman were added to the UNESCO list of World Heritage Sites: Falaj Al-Khatmeen, Falaj Al-Malki, Falaj Daris, Falaj Al-Mayassar and Falaj Al-Jeela.

Bombing during the Jebel Akhdar War 
Declassified information by the British National Archives later revealed that the British government deliberately destroyed the Aflaj Irrigation Systems and crops by air strikes during the Jebel Akhdar War in order to prevent locals in the interior of Oman from gathering crops and denying them access to water supplies. Wadi Beni Habib and the water channel at Semail were among the water supplies that were deliberately damaged. Air strikes on Saiq and Sharaijah rendered cultivation in the areas "hazardous". Furthermore, these documents reveal that the British Foreign Secretary gave the approval on 4 August 1957 to carry out air strikes without prior warning to the locals residing in the interior of Oman. The ban on visas for the press by the sultan and the ability of the British government to carry out air strikes discreetly using Masirah Airfield helped in sustaining the military operations under low profile.

World Heritage Designated Aflaj

See also
 Qanat

References

External links
 Explore the Aflaj Irrigation Systems of Oman in the UNESCO collection on Google Arts and Culture

World Heritage Sites in Oman
Irrigation in Oman
Irrigation